Small Mastiff Dogs may refer to:

 French Bulldog
 Pug
 Boston Terrier